This is a list of newspapers in Alaska.

Daily newspapers (currently published)This is a list of daily newspapers currently published in Alaska. For weekly newspapers, see List of newspapers in Alaska.
 Anchorage Daily News – Anchorage
 Daily Sitka Sentinel – Sitka Fairbanks Daily News-Miner – Fairbanks
 Juneau Empire – Juneau
 Ketchikan Daily News – Ketchikan
 Kodiak Daily Mirror – Kodiak
 Peninsula Clarion – Kenai

Weekly newspapers (currently published)
 Alaska Journal of Commerce – Anchorage
 Alaska Star – Eagle River and Chugiak
 Anchorage Press – Anchorage
 Arctic Sounder – Northwest Arctic Borough and North Slope Borough
 Bristol Bay Times – Bristol Bay
 Capital City Weekly – Juneau
 Chilkat Valley News – Haines
 Cordova Times – Cordova
 The Delta Discovery – Bethel
 Delta Wind – Delta Junction
 Dutch Harbor Fisherman – Aleutians / Pribilofs
 Homer News – Homer
 Mat-Su Valley Frontiersman – Wasilla / Matanuska-Susitna Valley (tri-weekly)
 The Nome Nugget – Nome
 Petersburg Pilot – Petersburg
 Petroleum News – Anchorage
 Seward Journal – Seward
 Seward Phoenix Log – Seward, Moose Pass
 Tundra Drums – Bethel and Yukon-Kuskokwim Delta
 The Valdez Star – Valdez
 Wrangell Sentinel - Wrangell

Monthly newspapers (currently published)
 "The Cordova Cogitator" Cordova, Alaska (monthly)
 The Ester Republic – Ester (monthly)
 The Skagway News – Skagway (bimonthly)

University newspapers
 The Northern Light – University of Alaska Anchorage (weekly)
 Sun Star – University of Alaska Fairbanks (weekly)
 The Whalesong – University of Alaska Southeast

Defunct newspapers
 Anchorage Times – Anchorage
 Insurgent49 – Anchorage
 Tundra Times – Fairbanks
 Homer Tribute -Homer

See also
List of African-American newspapers in Alaska

References

External links

Alaska